168 (one hundred [and] sixty-eight) is the natural number following 167 and preceding 169.

In mathematics
168 is an even number, a composite number, an abundant number, and an idoneal number.

There are 168 primes less than 1000. 168 is the product of the first two perfect numbers.

168 is the order of the group PSL(2,7), the second smallest nonabelian simple group.

From Hurwitz's automorphisms theorem, 168 is the maximum possible number of automorphisms of a genus 3 Riemann surface, this maximum being achieved by the Klein quartic, whose symmetry group is PSL(2,7). The Fano plane has 168 symmetries.

168 is the largest known n such that 2n does not contain all decimal digits.

In astronomy
 168P/Hergenrother is a periodic comet in the Solar System
 168 Sibylla is a dark Main belt asteroid

In the military
  was an Imperial Japanese Navy  during World War II
  is a United States Navy fleet tugboat
  was a United States Navy  during World War II
  was a United States Navy  during World War II
  was a United States Navy  during World War II
  was a United States Navy  during World War I
  was a United States Navy  during World War II
  was a United States Navy steamer during World War II
  was a La Salle-class transport during World War II

In movies
 The 168 Film Project in Los Angeles

In transportation
 New York City Subway stations
168th Street (New York City Subway); a subway station complex at 168th Street and Broadway consisting of:
168th Street (IRT Broadway – Seventh Avenue Line); serving the  train
168th Street (IND Eighth Avenue Line); serving the  trains
 168th Street (BMT Jamaica Line); was the former terminal of the BMT Jamaica Line in Queens
 British Rail Class 168
 VASP Flight 168 from Rio de Janeiro, Brazil to Fortaleza; crashed on June 8, 1982

In other fields
168 is also:

 The year AD 168 or 168 BC
 168 AH is a year in the Islamic calendar that corresponds to 784 – 785 CE
 The number of hours in a week, or 7 x 24 hours
 In the game of dominoes, tiles are marked with a number of spots, or pips. The Double 6 set (28 tiles) totals 168 pips
 Tracy 168, a New York City graffiti artist
 Minuscule 168 is a Greek minuscule manuscript of the New Testament
 Some Chinese consider 168 a lucky number, because it is roughly homophonous with the phrase "一路發", which means "fortune all the way", or, as the United States Mint claims- "Prosperity Forever" 
 168 is the name of the most commonly used laboratory strain of Bacillus subtilis, a bacterium

See also
 List of highways numbered 168
 United States Supreme Court cases, Volume 168
 United Nations Security Council Resolution 168

References

External links

 Number Facts and Trivia: 168
 The Number 168
 The Positive Integer 168
 Prime curiosities: 168

Integers